Boryza was a Persian city in Thrace (Achaemenid satrapy of Skudra) founded by King Darius the Great (522–486 BC). Hecataeus of Miletus (died ) mentioned Boryza as being located in the land of the Thynians on the southwestern Black Sea coast to the north of Byzantium, modern day Bulgaria and Turkey. The city was also mentioned by Stephanus of Byzantium (fl. 6th century AD). According to the modern historian Miroslav Izdimirski, Boryza must have been the residence of a Persian hyparch. 

Boryza's precise location remains unknown and the date of its foundation is debated; it was either founded before or during Darius's European Scythian campaign.

References

Sources

Further reading
 

Achaemenid Thrace
Darius the Great
Achaemenid cities
Populated places in ancient Thrace
Lost ancient cities and towns